Khaled Amber (Arabic:خالد عمبر) (born 23 April 1994) is an Emirati footballer. He currently plays for Emirates Club.

References

External links
 

Emirati footballers
1994 births
Living people
Emirates Club players
Association football midfielders
Place of birth missing (living people)
UAE Pro League players
UAE First Division League players